W. Harold Anderson (September 11, 1902 – June 13, 1967) was an American college men's basketball coach at Bowling Green State University and the University of Toledo. As a player, he played at Otterbein College, a small liberal arts college outside Columbus, Ohio. As a coach he was one of the first to win more than 500 games on the collegiate level. Anderson was inducted into the Naismith Basketball Hall of Fame in 1985 and the College Basketball Hall of Fame in 2006.

Early life
Anderson was born September 11, 1902 in Akron, Ohio. He attended Akron Central High School, where he played football, baseball, basketball and ran track.

He then attended Otterbein College in Westerville, Ohio where he earned eleven athletic letters: three each in football, baseball and basketball and two in track.

Coaching career
Anderson began his career as a teacher and coach at Wauseon High School (Ohio) and Toledo Waite High School.

Andreson Coached at the University of Toledo from 1934–1942 and compiled a record of 142–41.

Anderson then coached at Bowling Green State University from 1943–1963, with a record of 362–185.

His career collegiate coaching record was 504–226.

After his retirement from coaching, Anderson continued to serve Bowling Green State University as the Director of Athletics.

While pioneering the run and gun, up-tempo style of play, he developed eleven (all of whom played in the NBA) All-America athletes, including Don Otten, Hall of Fame inductee Nate Thurmond and 1950 NBA draft No. 1 overall pick Chuck Share.

Honors
 From 1960 to November 11, 2011, the Bowling Green Falcons played basketball in Anderson Arena, named in honor of their coach. The facility is still in use by other university sports.
 Bowling Green State University Athletics Hall of Fame (1966)
 Toledo Athletics Hall of Fame (1978)
 Anderson was enshrined in the Naismith Basketball Hall of Fame in 1985.
 In 2006, Anderson was inducted into the College Basketball Hall of Fame.
 Anderson is one of the charter inductees of the Ohio Basketball Hall of Fame (2006).

Head coaching record

References

External links
 Harold Anderson coaching record at Sports Reference
 

1902 births
1967 deaths
American men's basketball coaches
American men's basketball players
Basketball coaches from Ohio
Basketball players from Akron, Ohio
Bowling Green Falcons athletic directors
Bowling Green Falcons men's basketball coaches
College men's basketball head coaches in the United States
Naismith Memorial Basketball Hall of Fame inductees
National Collegiate Basketball Hall of Fame inductees
Otterbein Cardinals men's basketball players
Toledo Rockets men's basketball coaches